The Omnichord is an electronic musical instrument introduced in 1981 by the Suzuki Musical Instrument Corporation. It typically features a touch plate known as "Sonic Strings", preset rhythms, auto-bass line functionality, and buttons for major, minor, and 7th chords.  The most basic method of playing the instrument is to press the chord buttons and swipe the Sonic Strings with a finger in imitation of strumming a stringed instrument. The Sonic Strings may also be touched in one place to create a single note. Originally designed as an electronic Autoharp, the Omnichord has become popular, due to its unique, chiming, harplike timbre and its value as a kitsch object.

History 
Suzuki introduced the Omnichord along with the Tronichord, renamed the Portachord on some units, in 1981. The latter never reached full production, but both instrument share many technical and functional similarities. Omnichords feature preset rhythm patterns with tempo and volume control, as well as an auto-bass line feature, which the player can combine to use as a musical accompaniment. The Omnichord's most unique feature is the Sonic Strings strumplate, that allows the player to 'strum' arpeggios like a guitar. Several later models of the Omnichord added MIDI compatibility, a greater selection of sounds for the Sonic Strings, vibrato, and chord memory, called Chord Computer.

The OM27 was the first Omnichord model, released in 1981. It was capable of playing 27 chords, and early models required a rubber plectrum to play, though later models featured an updated strum plate. The OM27 was a commercial failure, so Suzuki released the OM36 and OM84 in 1984, also called the System One and System Two, respectively. The naming convention was originally meant to convey the number of chord types the model can produce, with OM36 prototypes only being able to play 36 chords, however the OM36 and OM84 production models can both play 84 chord types. The OM84 was the first model to feature an onboard Chord Computer, a feature that allowed the user to record a sequence of chords which could be played back as accompaniment.

In 1989, Suzuki released the OM100 and OM200M, which replaced the OM36 and OM84, adding updated sounds, an angled strumplate for more comfortable playing, and an optional strap for standing performances.

The OM200M additionally introduced a MIDI output port, allowing the user to control other MIDI-equipped devices using the Omnichord. The OM150 and OM250M offered refreshed sounds, and the OM300 released in 1995 offered the features of the OM250M but with more updated sounds.

Suzuki released the Qchord QC1 in 1999; it features more modern versions of the original Omnichord's features such as PCM sampled sounds, and more rhythms. The Qchord additionally features both MIDI input and MIDI output ports.

In February 2023, Suzuki announced an Omnichord reissue to celebrate the 70th anniversary of the company.

Sound and features 
The Omnichord was primarily designed as an accompaniment instrument instead of a melody instrument, an ideal way to accompany a singer with basic rhythms and the ability to easily play chords with little music theory knowledge.

The Omnichord has three main sound generators:

 A percussion section that plays rock, waltz, slow rock, Latin, foxtrot and swing rhythms, with adjustable tempo and volume.
 A chord generator providing different triad and seventh chords, either as organ-like chords or walking bass. The original OM27 was only capable of playing 27 different chords, but later models allow 84 different chords. 
 A Sonic Strings section producing an arpeggio or isolated notes from a chosen chord over a 4-octave span, played using the touch strip. The notes played on the touch strip are always in tune with the chord button currently selected. Later models featured a selection of different voices for the Sonic Strings, including vibes, brass, organ, guitar and banjo.

Later models feature a chord sequencer in a Chord Memory section that would allow the user to record up to 51 chords in sequence and play them back automatically or via a footswitch.

Notable uses 
 David Bowie played an Omnichord in his performance of Simon & Garfunkel's "America" for The Concert for New York City in 2001.
 Damon Albarn of Gorillaz used an Omnichord for the beat of "Clint Eastwood".
 Brian Eno used an Omnichord on "Deep Blue Day" as well as a live performance of "Miss Sarajevo" with Luciano Pavarotti and Bono in 1995.
 Daniel Lanois is an Omnichord user, having employed it on his own solo work (such as his debut album Acadie) and on U2's 1987 album The Joshua Tree.
 Joni Mitchell played an Omnichord on "The Only Joy in Town" from the album "Night Ride Home".
 "Love Is a Stranger" by Eurythmics features chords and Sonic Strings from the Omnichord.
 Minus the Bear used an Omnichord heavily on their album Omni.

Omnichord models

References

External links 

 
 Q-chord users
 Q-chord website

1981 musical instruments
Electronic musical instruments
1981 introductions